Liya may refer to:

 Liya Kebede (born 1978), Ethiopian model
 Liya Shakirova (1921–2015), Soviet and Russian linguist
 Liya, a Sindhi surname
 Lia, Iran, a village in Qazvin Province
 Liya (musician), Nigerian singer and songwriter